Stocklasa is a surname. Notable people with the surname include:

Martin Stocklasa (born 1979), Liechtenstein footballer
Michael Stocklasa (born 1980), Liechtenstein footballer

See also
Stoklasa